Francis Oliver (1832 – July 28, 1880) was an American soldier in the U.S. Army who served with the 1st U.S. Cavalry during the Indian Wars. He was one of thirty-two men received the Medal of Honor for gallantry against the Apache Indians in the Chiricahua Mountains, later known as the "Campaign of the Rocky Mesa", on October 20, 1869.

Biography
Francis Oliver was born in Baltimore, Maryland in 1832. Enlisting in the U.S. Army at Fort Fillmore, New Mexico, he was assigned to frontier duty with the 1st U.S. Cavalry and eventually reached the rank of first sergeant. Oliver saw action against the Apache in the Arizona Territory during the late 1860s, most notably, during the "Campaign of the Rocky Mesa" in late 1869. He was among the members of the 1st and 8th Cavalry, under the commands of Lieutenant William H. Winters and Captain Reuben F. Bernard, who pursued an Apache raiding party led by Cochise that had massacred a stage coach en route to Tucson and attacked a group of cowboys in the Sulphur Springs Valley on October 5, 1868. The cavalry detachment pursued the Apache to Cochise's stronghold in the Chiricahua Mountains where they did battle on October 20, 1869. Oliver led a group of troopers during the fight and was cited for bravery in action. He was among the 32 soldiers who received the Medal of Honor on February 14, 1870. Oliver died in Lewiston, Idaho on July 28, 1880, and buried in Normal Hill Cemetery.

Medal of Honor citation
Rank and organization: First Sergeant, Company G, 1st U.S. Cavalry Place and date: At Chiricahua Mountains, Ariz., 20 October 1869. Entered service at: ------. Birth: Baltimore, Md. Date of issue: 14 February 1870.

Citation:

Bravery in action.

See also

List of Medal of Honor recipients for the Indian Wars

References

Further reading
Konstantin, Phil. This Day in North American Indian History: Important Dates in the History of North America's Native Peoples for Every Calendar Day. New York: Da Capo Press, 2002.

External links

1832 births
1880 deaths
American military personnel of the Indian Wars
United States Army Medal of Honor recipients
Military personnel from Baltimore
United States Army soldiers
American Indian Wars recipients of the Medal of Honor